Bertrand Perz is an Austrian academic who is known for his research into Mauthausen concentration camp.

Works
 Reprinted by Studienverlag (2014)

References

Historians of the Holocaust
20th-century Austrian historians
Historians of Austria
1958 births
Living people
21st-century Austrian historians